Calamia deliciosa is a moth of the family Noctuidae. It is found in Afghanistan.

References 

Hadeninae
Moths described in 1957